Giulio Cagiati (born 1863, date of death unknown) was an Italian fencer. He competed in the individual épée event at the 1908 Summer Olympics.

References

1863 births
Year of death missing
Italian male fencers
Olympic fencers of Italy
Fencers at the 1908 Summer Olympics
Fencers from Rome
People of the Papal States